Abbasi is a surname derived from the personal name Abbas, implying descent or association with someone called Abbas. The name is especially popular in Pakistan and Iran. In particular, it may be used by families claiming descent from Abbas ibn Abd al-Muttalib (the uncle of the Islamic prophet Muhammad) or from similar ancestral sources. Notable people with this surname include:

 Ali Abbasi (director) (born 1981), Iranian-Danish film director
 Ali Abbasi (television host) (1961–2004), Pakistani-born Scottish television presenter
 Amanullah Abbasi, Pakistani judge
 Anoushay Abbasi, Pakistani actress
 Ansar Abbasi, Pakistani journalist
 Aram Abbasi, Iranian football player
 Armita Abbasi (born 2001), Iranian protestor, assaulted and detained as a prisoner
 Asadollah Abbasi, Iranian politician
 Ashraf Abbasi, Pakistani politician
 Shahid Khaqan Abbasi, Pakistani politician and businessman, prime minister of Pakistan 2017–2018
 Muhammad Hanif Abbasi, Pakistani politician and businessman
 Muhammad Javed Abbasi, Pakistani Politician, Senator
 Davoud Seyed-Abbasi, Iranian football player
 Forough Abbasi, Iranian alpine skier
 Hamza Ali Abbasi, Pakistani actor and the religious student of Islamic scholar Javed Ahmad Ghamidi
 Heydar Abbasi, Iranian poet
 Imtiaz Abbasi, UAE cricketer
 Javeria Abbasi, Pakistani film–television actress
 Kashif Abbasi, Pakistani journalist
 Kazi Jalil Abbasi, Indian politician
 Mohammad Abbas Abbasi, Pakistani politician
 Mohammad Abbasi, Iranian politician
 Mohammadreza Abbasi, Iranian football player
 Muhammad Nawaz Abbasi, Pakistani judge
 Murtaza Javed Abbasi, Deputy Speaker National Assembly of Pakistan
 Mustafa Zaman Abbasi, Bangladeshi musicologist
 Muztar Abbasi, Pakistani Muslim scholar
 Nadeem Abbasi, Pakistani cricketer
 Nawab Salahuddin Abbasi, Pakistani politician&
 Sardar Mehtab Abbasi, Pakistani politician from Abbottabad, who also served as Governor of Khyber Pakhtunkhwa, Pakistan from 2014 to 2016
 Shaykh 'Abbasi, Persian painter
 Soulmaz Abbasi, Iranian rower
 Tanveer Abbasi, Pakistani poet
 Vahid Seyed-Abbasi, Iranian volleyball player
 Zafar Mahmood Abbasi, Pakistan navy officer
 Zeeshan Abbasi, Pakistani cricketer

References 

Surnames of Indo-Iranian origin
Hashemite people
Pakistani names